The following railways operate in the Canadian province of Ontario.

Common freight carriers
Barrie Collingwood Railway (BCRY)
Canadian National Railway (CN) including subsidiaries Algoma Central Railway (AC), Grand Trunk Western Railroad (GTW), and Sault Ste. Marie Bridge Company (SSAM), and lessor Arnprior–Nepean Railway
Canadian Pacific Railway (CP)
CSX Transportation (CSXT)
Essex Terminal Railway (ETL)
Goderich–Exeter Railway (GEXR)
Huron Central Railway (HCRY)
Minnesota, Dakota and Western Railway (MDW)
Norfolk Southern Railway (NS)
Ontario Northland Railway (ONT) including subsidiary Nipissing Central Railway
Ontario Southland Railway (OS)
Ottawa Valley Railway (RLK)
Southern Ontario Railway (RLHH)
Trillium Railway (TRRY) through subsidiaries Port Colborne Harbour Railway and St. Thomas and Eastern Railway

Passenger carriers
Amtrak (AMTK)
Capital Railway
Falls Incline Railway
Port Stanley Terminal Rail
South Simcoe Railway
Via Rail (Via)
Waterloo Central Railway
York–Durham Heritage Railway
Algoma Central Railway (CN)
Polar Bear Express (ONTC)

Light Rail Transit

 Ion rapid transit
 OC Transpo
 Toronto Transit Commission

Defunct railways

Electric
Belleville Traction Company
Berlin and Bridgeport Electric Street Railway
Berlin and Northern Railway
Berlin and Waterloo Street Railway
Brantford and Hamilton Electric Railway
Brantford Street Railway
Buffalo Railway
Canadian National Electric Railways
Chatham, Wallaceburg and Lake Erie Railway
City Railway of Windsor
City and Suburban Electric Railway
Cornwall Electric Street Railway
Cornwall Street Railway, Light and Power Company
Davenport Street Railway
Fort William Electric Railway
Galt and Preston Street Railway
Galt, Preston and Hespeler Street Railway
Grand River Railway (GRNR)
Grand Valley Railway
Guelph Railway
Guelph Radial Railway
Hamilton Cataract Power, Light and Traction Company
Hamilton and Dundas Street Railway
Hamilton Electric Light and Cataract Power Company
Hamilton, Grimsby and Beamsville Electric Railway
Hamilton Radial Electric Railway
Hamilton Street Railway
Hamilton, Waterloo and Guelph Railway
Huron, Bruce and Grey Electric Railway
 Huron and Ontario Electric Railway (c. 1906 planned and never built)
Hydro-Electric Railways
International Railway
International Transit Company
Kingston, Portsmouth and Cataraqui Electric Railway
Kingston Street Railway
Kitchener and Waterloo Street Railway
Lake Erie and Northern Railway (LEN)
Leander Colt Incline
London and Lake Erie Railway and Transportation Company
London and Port Stanley Railway (LPS)
London Street Railway
Maid of the Mist Incline
Metropolitan Street Railway
Metropolitan Street Railway of Toronto
Middlesex and Elgin Inter-urban Railway
Mount McKay and Kakabeka Falls Railway
Niagara Falls, Park and River Railway
Niagara Falls, Wesley Park and Clifton Tramway Company
Niagara, St. Catharines and Toronto Railway (NS&T)
Niagara, Welland and Lake Erie Railway
Nipissing Central Railway
North Yonge Railways
Ontario Southern Railway
Ontario Traction Company
Ontario West Shore Railway
Ontario West Shore Electric Railway
Oshawa Railway
Ottawa City Passenger Railway
Ottawa Electric Railway
Ottawa Electric Street Railway
Peterboro and Ashburnham Street Railway
Peterboro Radial Railway
Port Arthur Civic Company
Port Arthur Electric Street Railway
Port Arthur and Fort William Electric Railway
Port Dalhousie, St. Catharines and Thorold Electric Street Railway
Port Dover, Brantford, Berlin and Goderich Railway
Preston and Berlin Railway
St. Catharines, Merritton and Thorold Railway
St. Catharines and Niagara Central Railway
St. Catharines Street Railway
St. Thomas Street Railway
Sandwich, Windsor and Amherstburg Railway
Sandwich and Windsor Passenger Railway
Sarnia Street Railway
Schomberg and Aurora Railway
South Essex Electric Railway
Southwestern Traction Company
Sudbury and Copper Cliff Suburban Electric Railway
Toronto Railway
Toronto and Mimico Railway
Toronto and Mimico Electric Railway and Light Company
Toronto and Scarboro' Electric Railway, Light and Power Company
Toronto Street Railway
Toronto Suburban Railway
Toronto Suburban Street Railway
Toronto and York Radial Railway
Weston, High Park and Toronto Street Railway
Whirlpool Rapids Incline
Windsor, Essex and Lake Shore Rapid Railway (WE&L)
Windsor and Tecumseh Electric Railway
Woodstock, Thames Valley and Ingersoll Electric Railway

Private freight carriers
Rama Timber Transport Company
Nosbonsing and Nipissing Railway
Whitney and Opeongo Railway
Egan Estates Railway
Orangeville Brampton Railway

Passenger carriers
Waterloo – St. Jacobs Railway

Never completed
Ontario and Pacific Junction Railway
Toronto Eastern Railway

See also

 Rail transport in Ontario
 History of rail transport in Canada
 List of defunct Canadian railways

Notes

References

Index to Railway Legislation (1867–1907)

 
 
Ontario
Railways